Gustavo Álvarez Gardeazábal (born 31 October 1945) is a Colombian writer, and politician. He attended the University of Valle and was the runner-up for a Premio Nadal in 1971 for Dabeiba. He was awarded a Guggenheim Fellowship in 1984. and was Governor of Valle del Cauca Department from 1998–1999. He also wrote the highly rated telenovela El Bazar de los Idiotas. He is one of the few atheists to hold public office in Colombia.

References

1945 births
Living people
Colombian male writers
Colombian columnists
Governors of Valle del Cauca Department
Mayors of places in Colombia
Colombian radio journalists
Colombian LGBT politicians
Colombian LGBT journalists
Colombian gay writers
Gay politicians
Gay journalists
Colombian atheists
Colombian atheist writers